Restoule Lake is a lake found in the Almaguin Highlands region of the Parry Sound District in the province of Ontario, Canada.
It is one of the larger lakes in the area and contains many islands. It was discovered by fur traders. The lake is named after native chief Joseph Restoule.  The Grawbrager family were the first to settle there in 1840. Restoule Provincial Park is located on the north shore of the lake.

See also
List of lakes in Ontario

References
 National Resources Canada

Lakes of Parry Sound District